The year 1969 in architecture involved some significant architectural events and new buildings.

Events
January 8 – At the Smithsonian Institution in Washington, D.C., the Hirshhorn Museum and Sculpture Garden building is begun, with ground-breaking by President of the United States Lyndon B. Johnson, Chief Justice Earl Warren, and the Secretary S. Dillon Ripley.
April 3 – Pope Paul VI promulgates the apostolic constitution Missale Romanum which confirms the desirability of celebration of Mass facing the congregation in Catholic churches, with implication for their internal layout.

Buildings and structures

Buildings opened

March 7 – The John Hancock Center in Chicago, Illinois, by Skidmore, Owings and Merrill.
May 19 — Robert H. Goddard Library, Clark University, designed by John M. Johansen.
 June – Houses for Visiting Mathematicians, University of Warwick, Coventry, England, designed by Bill Howell of Howell, Killick, Partridge and Amis.
September 18 – Dresden TV tower (Fernsehturm Dresden-Wachwit) begins radio transmission in Dresden, Germany.
October 3 – Fernsehturm Berlin (Berlin TV tower) in East Berlin, Germany.
St. John's Beacon in Liverpool, England.

Buildings completed
 Knights of Columbus Building (New Haven, Connecticut), designed by Roche-Dinkeloo
 One New York Plaza, Manhattan, New York City, designed by William Lescaze & Associates and Kahn & Jacobs
 Bank One Plaza, Chicago, Illinois (renamed as the Chase Tower on October 24, 2005)
 555 California Street (formerly The Bank of America Center), San Francisco, California, the tallest building west of the Mississippi from 1969 to 1972
 Sultan Yahya Petra Bridge, Kelantan, Malaysia
 Toronto-Dominion Centre (formerly the Royal Trust Tower) is partially completed in Toronto, Ontario, Canada
 Hilton Hotel, Paradise, Nevada, designed by architect Martin Stern, Jr.
 Ullasund Bridge, Norway (replaced in 1998)
 Wyndham Court, Southampton, England
 Span Developments houses at New Ash Green, Kent, England, designed by Eric Lyons
 Benjamin's Mount, Perry House or Teesdale (private residence), Westwood Road, Windlesham, Surrey, England, designed by Ernő Goldfinger
 Taivallahti Church, Helsinki, Finland, designed by Timo and Tuomo Suomalainen in 1960
 King George VI Memorial Chapel at St George's Chapel, Windsor Castle, Berkshire, England, designed by George Pace

Awards
AIA Gold Medal – William Wilson Wurster
Architecture Firm Award – Jones & Emmons
RAIA Gold Medal – Robin Boyd
RIBA Royal Gold Medal – Jack Antonio Coia
Twenty-five Year Award – Rockefeller Center

Births
February 28 – Sadie Morgan, English architect and designer
date unknown – Sami Rintala, Finnish architect and artist

Deaths

February 11 – Frederic Joseph DeLongchamps, Nevada-based architect (born 1882)
May 23 – Owen Williams, English structural engineer (died 1969)
July 5 – Walter Gropius, German architect and founder of the Bauhaus School (born 1883)
August 8 – Welton Becket, Los Angeles architect (born 1902)
August 17 – Ludwig Mies van der Rohe, German-American architect and last director of the Bauhaus (born 1886)
August 19 – Sir Percy Thomas, Cardiff-based architect (born 1883)
November 7 – Ernesto Nathan Rogers, Italian architect, writer and educator (born 1909)
December 15 – Ruth Rivera Marín, Mexican architect (born 1927)

References

 
20th-century architecture